Harry Lowe may refer to:

Harry Lowe (footballer, born March 1886) (1886–1958), English footballer for Gainsborough Trinity, Liverpool and Nottingham Forest
Harry Lowe (footballer, born August 1886) (1886–1966), English footballer for Northwich Victoria, Brighton & Hove Albion, Tottenham Hotspur and Fulham
Harry Lowe (footballer, born 1907) (1907–1988), Scottish born footballer for Watford and QPR
Harry James Lowe Jr. (1922–1942), seaman in the United States Navy

See also
Harry Low (1882–1920), Scottish footballer
Harold Lowe (1882–1944), officer on the Titanic